Life At The Top is the third novel by the English author John Braine, first published in the UK by Eyre & Spottiswoode and in the US by Houghton Mifflin & Co. in 1962. It continues the story of the life and difficulties of Joe Lampton, an ambitious young man of humble origins. A 1965 film adaptation of the novel was made starring Laurence Harvey.

Plot summary
It is ten years further on from when last we learned of Joe's life in Room At The Top. He now has everything he thought he wanted – the upper-class wife, an executive job, two cars and two children for his new house. Yet, Joe is still a dissatisfied man – his job had not moved significantly forward in the last ten years. This dissatisfaction leads him back to his old philandering ways – spurred on by the knowledge of his wife's own infidelity. Joe and Susan separate temporarily but, towards the novel's close, Joe is drawn back to his life in Warley in response to trouble with his children and his knowledge of what his life needs.

1962 British novels
British novels adapted into films
Eyre & Spottiswoode books
Novels by John Braine
Sequel novels